The Double 0 Kid is a 1993 direct-to-video family adventure/comedy film starring Corey Haim, Nicole Eggert and Brigitte Nielsen.

Plot summary
17-year-old Lance Elliot is a summer intern at the Agency. His fantasies of espionage and intrigue turn real when he's ordered to rush a package to L.A. A madman millionaire computer virus designer, Cashpot, and his icy henchwoman Rhonda want that package. It's key to their plot to destroy the environment. Lance stays one step ahead of them, trying to avoid a visit to their "video-game-of-doom" room.

Cast
 Corey Haim as Lance Elliot
 Brigitte Nielsen as Rhonda
 Wallace Shawn as Cashpot
 Nicole Eggert as Melinda Blake
 John Rhys-Davies as Rudolph ("Rudi") von Kessenbaum
 Basil Hoffman as Trout
 Karen Black as Mrs. Elliot
 Anne Francis as Maggie Lomax
 Seth Green as Chip
 John Birch as Truck Driver
 Leslie Danon as Charlene, French girl
 Patrick M. Wright as Banker
 Bari K. Willerford as Luther
 Jim Alquist as Tyler
 Josh Collier as Billy
 Chuck Hicks as Sam Wynberg
 Steven Paul as Room Service Bellman (uncredited)

Notes

References

External links
 
 
 
 Double 0 Kid - Columbus Films Ltd.

1992 direct-to-video films
1992 films
1990s teen comedy films
1990s spy comedy films
American teen comedy films
American spy comedy films
Films shot in Los Angeles
Teensploitation
1990s English-language films
Films directed by Dee McLachlan
1990s American films